Kleeberg is a surname of German origin. People with that name include:

 Clotilde Kleeberg (1866–1909), French pianist
 Franciszek Kleeberg (1888–1941), Polish general
 Michael Kleeberg (born 1959), German writer and translator
 Minna Kleeberg (1841–1878), German-American poet
 Sophie Kleeberg (born 1990), German shot putter

See also
 Klee

See also
 

Surnames of German origin
Jewish surnames
Yiddish-language surnames
German-language surnames